Grange Hill is a British television children's drama series portraying life in a typical secondary school.

Grange Hill may also refer to:

Places
 Grange Hill, County Durham, a village in County Durham
 Grange Hill, Essex, suburb in Chigwell on the boundary of the Epping Forest district of Essex and the London Borough of Redbridge in East London
 Grange Hill tube station, situated directly on the boundary
 Grange Hill, Jamaica, a village
 Grange Hill (New York), an elevation in Oneida County, New York
 Grange Hill, North Ayrshire, Scotland
 Grangehill, a heritage-listed house in Brisbane, Queensland, Australia
 Grangehill, alternative name for The Kirna, a Ballantyne villa in Walkerburn, Scotland between 1903 and 1919

Other
 Grange Hill (video game), a 1987 computer game by Argus Press Software for Commodore 64, ZX Spectrum and Amstrad CPC

See also
Grange Hall (disambiguation)